All Night Session! Vol. 2 is the second album by pianist Hampton Hawes from a session recorded the night of November 12/13, 1956 at Contemporary's Studios in Los Angeles and released on the Contemporary label.

Reception

The Allmusic review states "In 1958 Hawes was quoted as saying "It's hard to put into words how good it feels to play jazz when it's really swinging...I've reached a point where the music fills you up so much emotionally that you feel like shouting hallelujah -- like people do in church when they're converted to God. That's the way I was feeling the night we recorded All Night Session!" ".

Track listing

Personnel
Hampton Hawes – piano
Jim Hall – guitar
Red Mitchell – bass 
Eldridge Freeman – drums

References

Contemporary Records albums
Hampton Hawes albums
1958 albums